Shahrestan (also Romanized as Shahrestān; also known as Pā’īn Maḩalleh-ye Shahrestān) is a village in Eslamabad Rural District, Sangar District, Rasht County, Gilan Province, Iran. At the 2006 census, its population was 3,511, in 949 families.

References 

Populated places in Rasht County